Scott Elder Harper (born Scott Gleckler; December 22, 1952) is an American composer, arranger and musician for motion picture and television scores and orchestra, as well as a multi-instrumentalist, conductor, and session-player for pop music. With a background in popular music, Harper has composed theater pieces, oratorios, orchestral chamber works, and dynamic and diverse ensemble arrangements with various instrumental combinations for popular recording artists and film scores alike. His work includes conducting and album arrangements for Celine Dion, Cher, and Olivia Newton-John. He has performed on multiple original motion picture soundtracks, such as E.T. the Extra-Terrestrial (1983), Indiana Jones and the Temple of Doom (1984) — scored by John Williams — and The Right Stuff  (1983), by Bill Conti, as a double bass player in the Hollywood Studio Symphony Orchestra. He has also composed several original scores for documentary feature films.

Biography 
Scott E. Harper was born in Pasadena, California, to David Gleckler and Sarah Lee. He has two brothers, Steve and Jim, and a sister, Milly. In 1975, Scott attended the Royal College of Music in London for composition, cello, and piano, before majoring in double bass. He graduated with honors in 1977 in only two years. The Royal College of Music awarded him the Cobbett Prize for "Freer Thou", his composition with clarinet, violoncello, and piano.

His feature film compositions include Eat and Run, Orion's Belt, Rendez-vous, Reborn, To Hell With Love. A film critic states in Variety magazine that "Movies benefit greatly from Scott Harper's jazz-inflected scores because the score infectiously adds wily, contrapuntal undertones and smart upbeat riffs to the action". Harper wrote the original underscores to numerous feature-length documentary specials during the mid-1980s. From adventurous National Geographic Specials to comedy prime-time TV series, Harper composed music with variety in style to a wide-range audience. In 1986, Scott Harper and co-writer Lyn Murray were awarded an Emmy Award for Outstanding Achievement in Music Composition for the National Geographic Special: Miraculous Machines. Then in 1990, Special BMI Awards were honoring Composers work in film and prime-time television. Harper was awarded a second Emmy in the Music Categories for "Amazon, Land of The Flooded Forest", a National Geographic Special on PBS.

Harper's compositions won the Sunny Awards (GTE) competition, including 1st Place in the Campaign category and 1st place in the Music category.

In 1980, he changed his name from Gleckler to Harper.

Harper married Susan Picking Harper on May 1, 1994. They have daughter named Lauralee.

Discography

Original motion picture soundtracks 
Performances with the  Hollywood Studio Symphony Orchestra
2018: Commando (Original Motion Picture Soundtrack) – bass player
2008: Indiana Jones: The Complete Soundtracks Collection (Original Motion Picture Soundtracks) – bass player
1987: Harry and the Hendersons (Original Motion Picture Soundtrack) – bass player
1984: Indiana Jones and the Temple of Doom (Original Motion Picture Soundtrack) – bass player
1983: The Right Stuff (Original Motion Picture Soundtrack) – bass player
1983: E.T., the Extraterrestrial (Original Motion Picture Soundtrack) – Double bass player

Film and TV music compositions
1999: The Free Willy Story – Keiko's Journey Home (TV movie) – composer
1998: To Hell With Love (feature film) – composer
1994: Roseanne: An Unauthorized Biography (TV movie) – composer
1993: Phenom (TV series) – composer, 2 episodes
"Crazy for You" (1993) 
"Answered Prayers" (1993) – composer
1992: Hearts Are Wild (TV series) – composer
1991: Night Games (film) – composer
1991: The Point! (film) – composer
1990: A Woman's Heart (film short) – composer
1989: Serengeti Diary (TV film) – composer of "a lovely, subdued score"
1987: Eat & Run (feature film)

Documentary scores
2008: Proof of Propaganda (documentary) – composer
2008: Food Fight (documentary) – composer
1993: Wilderness: The Last Stand (documentary) – 3 episodes
1990–1992: World of Discovery (documentary TV series) – composer; 2 episodes: 
"Realm of the Serpent" (1992) 
"Inventors: Out Of Their Minds" (1990)
1992: Survive Siberia (documentary TV film) – composer
1990: The Urban Gorilla (documentary TV film) – composer
1990: Amazon: Land of the Flooded Forest (documentary TV film) – Emmy Award for Outstanding Achievement in Music & Composition 
1985–1989: National Geographic Specials (documentary feature film TV series):
"Those Wonderful Dogs" (1989) – composer 
"Mysteries of Mankind" (1988) – composer
"The Grizzlies" (1987) – composer
"Miraculous Machines" (1985) – composer; Emmy Award for Outstanding Achievement in Music & Composition
1987: The Grizzlies (documentary TV film)

Popular music

2008: Three Graces, Three Graces – orchestration, string arrangements
2005: Chronicles, Cher -album arrangements
2003: A Time for the Soul, Winard Harper – percussion
2002: Memphis Rockabillies: Hillbillies and Honky Tonkers – composer
2002: The Slash Recordings, The Blasters – composer
2002: The Colour of My Love, Celine Dion – conductor, string arrangements, string conductor
1999: Say Man!, Bill Stuve – composer
1998: Backtracking: The Duke Recordings, Vol. 2, Junior Parker – composer
1997: Ricky Jones, Ricky Jones – conductor, orchestral arrangements
1997: Ultimatum, Ultimatum – engineer
1996: Chapters, Steve Chapman – guitar (bass)
1996: Kissing Rain, Roch Voisine – conductor, string arrangements
1994: Federico Mompou: Music for Piano, Michel Wagemans – audio engineer
1993: The Colour of My Love, Celine Dion – string arrangements, string conductor
1992: Deeper Than A River, Back to Basics
1991: Love Hurts, Cher – album arrangements

Performances
 1983: Karen Akers

Awards 

|-
| 1977
| "Freer Thou"
| Cobbett Prize, Royal College of Music
| 
| Clarinet, violoncello, piano
|-
| 1986
| Miraculous Machines
| 20th Primetime Emmy Awards  Outstanding Achievement in Musical Composition
| 
| with Lyn Murray
|-
| 1990
| Amazon, Land of the Flooded Forest
| 23rd Primetime Emmy Awards  Individual Achievement in Musical Composition
| 
|

References

External links
Full Score Productions – official website

20th-century American composers
American double-bassists
Male double-bassists
20th-century classical composers
20th-century American conductors (music)
21st-century American composers
21st-century classical composers
21st-century American conductors (music)
American classical composers
American male conductors (music)
American film score composers
American male classical composers
American music arrangers
Living people
American male film score composers
Primetime Emmy Award winners
1952 births
21st-century double-bassists
20th-century American male musicians
21st-century American male musicians